Jan Engels  or Jean Engels (11 May 1922, Sint-Genesius-Rode – 17 April 1972, Heverlee) is a former Belgian professional road bicycle racer. He was professional from 1945 to 1952 and won 7 victories. He wore the yellow jersey in the 1948 Tour de France. His victories included the 1945 edition of Liège–Bastogne–Liège,

Major results

1944
Pamel
1945
GP des Ardennes
Liège–Bastogne–Liège
Sint-Genesius-Rode
1947
Roubaix–Huy
1948
Tour de France:
Wore yellow jersey for one day

References

External links 

Jean Engels - official Tour de France results

1922 births
1972 deaths
Belgian male cyclists
People from Sint-Genesius-Rode
Cyclists from Flemish Brabant
20th-century Belgian people